Aristolochia maxima  is a plant species native to Central and South America, naturalized in southern Florida. Common names include Florida Dutchman's-pipe (US), canastilla (Guatemala), guaco (El Salvador), and tecolotillo (Mexico).  In Florida, it grows in hammocks in the Everglades at elevations below 50 m (170 feet).

Aristolochia maxima is a liana (woody vine) that can reach a height of 20 m (67 feet), twining over other plants.  Leaves are truncate to cuneate at the base. Flowers are brownish-purple.

References

maxima
Flora of Florida
Flora of Central America
Flora of South America
Plants described in 1760
Taxa named by Nikolaus Joseph von Jacquin